Top Wing is a Canadian computer-animated television series created by Matthew Fernandes of Industrial Brothers and produced by Industrial Brothers and 9 Story Media Group. It premiered on Nickelodeon in the United States on November 6, 2017, and debuted on Treehouse in Canada on January 6, 2018.

The following is a list of episodes from the series Top Wing.

Series overview

Episodes

Season 1 (2017–18)

Season 2 (2019–20)

Notes

References

Top Wing
Top Wing